Eight Hundred Heroes is a 1976 Taiwanese historical war drama film directed by Ting Shan-hsi about the Defense of Sihang Warehouse in 1937 Shanghai, China. The film was selected as the Taiwanese entry for the Best Foreign Language Film at the 49th Academy Awards, but was not accepted as a nominee.

Cast
 Ko Chun-hsiung as Lieutenant Colonel Xie Jinyuan
 Brigitte Lin as Yang Huimin
 Hsu Feng as Ling Weicheng, Xie's wife
 Sylvia Chang as Li Cini, a girl guide
 Chin Han as Major Shangguan Zhibiao
 Carter Wong
 Chin Han
 Chan Hung-lit
 Peter Yang
 Sihung Lung

See also
 List of submissions to the 49th Academy Awards for Best Foreign Language Film
 List of Taiwanese submissions for the Academy Award for Best Foreign Language Film

References

External links
 
 

1976 films
1976 drama films
1970s war drama films
1970s Mandarin-language films
Second Sino-Japanese War films
Films set in 1937
Films set in Shanghai
Siege films
Taiwanese war drama films
Central Motion Picture Corporation films
Films directed by Ting Shan-hsi